Calnan is a surname found in England and in Ireland with several origins.

Originating from the Irish Gaelic O Cathalain.

Royal connections
The name is derived from Cathalan, King of Farney slain in 1028, whose name means Little Charles, and from whom the family is thought to have descended. Cathalan was in turn descended from Coleman Mor, the King of Meath and the 133rd Monarch of Ireland.

In military service
 Thomas D. Calnan (born 1915), English pilot and prisoner of war, writer of memoir Free As A Running Fox
 George Charles Calnan (1900–1933), US Naval officer and fencer, won three bronze medals in four Summer Olympics
 Michael David Calnan (1932–2018), Canadian Forces officer and municipal politician

In politics
 Michael Calnan, former Irish Labour Party politician and senator from County Cork

In sports
 Joseph Calnan (1876–1947), New Zealand rugby player
 Clement Noel Calnan (1888–1974), English cricketer
 Will Calnan (born 1996), English field hockey player

Other
 John Calnan (1932–2016), American comic book artist

References

English-language surnames
Surnames of English origin
Surnames of Irish origin
Anglicised Irish-language surnames
Patronymic surnames